Sir Alexander Malcolm MacEwen (10 January 1875 – 29 June 1941) was a Scottish politician and solicitor who served as the inaugural leader of the Scottish National Party (SNP) from 1934 to 1936.

Early life
Alexander Malcolm MacEwen was born on 10 January 1875 in Calcutta, India, the son of Robert Sutherland Taylor MacEwen (1839-1900), a barrister from Dornoch who served in India as the Recorder of Rangoon. MacEwen was educated at Clifton College, Bristol and the University of Edinburgh. After qualifying as a solicitor in 1901, he began his legal career in Stornoway, before joining the Inverness legal firm of Stewart Rule & Co., where he later became senior partner.

Political career
A member of the Liberal Party, MacEwen was elected to Inverness Town Council in 1908, and served as Provost of Inverness 1925–1931. During his period in office, Provost MacEwen promoted schemes for the improvement of public health and housing in Inverness, and served as a member of the Inverness-shire Education Committee, and as Chairman of the Board of Directors of the Royal Northern Infirmary. He also served as a councillor on Inverness County Council, representing Benbecula.

He was Chief of the Gaelic Society in 1930.

In 1932 MacEwen was one of the founders of the Scottish Party, and in the 1933 Kilmarnock by-election he stood as the joint candidate of the Scottish Party and the National Party of Scotland, coming fourth with 6,098 votes.

Leadership of the Scottish National Party (1934–1936) 
With merger of the National Party of Scotland and the Scottish Party on 7 April 1934 to form the Scottish National Party, MacEwen became the new party's first leader. The party's performance in the 1935 general election was disappointing with only Inverness and MacEwan in the Western Isles achieving respectable results.

MacEwen stood down as leader of the SNP in 1936, when he was succeeded by Andrew Dewar Gibb. He died at his home on the Black Isle in 1941, aged 66. MacEwen had three sons and two daughters. His son Malcolm joined the Communist Party of Great Britain and became a prominent conservationist.

Honours
He was knighted by King George V in the 1932 Birthday Honours for services to local government and public health in Scotland. MacEwen Drive in Inverness is named after him.

Publications
The Thistle and the Rose - Scotlands Problem To-Day, 1932
Scotland at School - Education for Citizenship, 1938
Towards Freedom, 1938

References

1875 births
1941 deaths
Alumni of the University of Edinburgh
Knights Bachelor
Leaders of the Scottish National Party
People educated at Clifton College
Politicians from Kolkata
Provosts in Scotland
Scottish Liberal Party councillors
Members of Inverness County Council